John Flournoy Henry (January 17, 1793 – November 12, 1873) was a U.S. Representative from Kentucky.

Born at Scott County, Kentucky, Henry attended Georgetown Academy, Kentucky, and Jefferson Medical College, Philadelphia, Pennsylvania.
He graduated from the College of Physicians and Surgeons in 1817.
He served at Fort Meigs in 1813 as surgeon's mate of Kentucky troops.
He engaged in agricultural pursuits and the practice of medicine. He owned slaves.

Henry was elected as an Adams candidate to the Nineteenth Congress to fill the vacancy caused by the death of his brother Robert P. Henry and served from December 11, 1826, to March 3, 1827.
He was an unsuccessful candidate for reelection in 1827 to the Twentieth Congress.
Professor in the Medical College of Ohio at Cincinnati in 1831.
He moved to Bloomington, Illinois, in 1834 and to Burlington, Iowa, in 1845 and resumed the practice of medicine.
He died in Burlington, Iowa, November 12, 1873.
He was interred in Aspen Grove Cemetery.

References

1793 births
1873 deaths
People from Scott County, Kentucky
American people of Scottish descent
National Republican Party members of the United States House of Representatives from Kentucky
Physicians from Kentucky
American slave owners
Thomas Jefferson University alumni
University of Cincinnati faculty
Kentucky militia
American militiamen in the War of 1812
People from Kentucky in the War of 1812